Rubicon Research is an IP led, specialty pharmaceutical company located in Mumbai, India. Its formulation development is across multiple dosage forms, oral solids, oral liquids, nasal, ophthalmic, topical, injectable, fixed dose combinations, and drug device combinations. In 2019 the company received USD 100 million in growth capital investment from General Atlantic, a growth equity firm.

The company operates out of four locations. The corporate HQ and R&D center is in Thane, India. There's also an R&D center in Concord, Canada, a manufacturing plant located in Ambernath, India, and a regulatory office in Plainsboro, US.

History and Evolution

Rubicon Research was founded in 1999 by Pratibha Pilgaonkar, Sudhir Pilgaonkar, and Maharukh Rustomjee. In 2000 it started operations as an independent product development company, located in Bhandup, Mumbai, with three scientists in a  laboratory. It became an outsourcing partner to the global healthcare and pharmaceutical industry. In 2003, the Directorate of Science and Technology, Government of India approved the facilities as a commercial Research and Development (R&D) company.

In 2006-07 Rubicon licensed its Orodispersible excipient, RubiODT to Mallinckrodt Baker, Inc.

In 2009 the company commission an oral solids manufacturing plant in Ambernath, India. The 140,000+ square feet cGM production facility is compliant with US FDA and EU specifications. Rubicon Research started its commercial manufacturing and shipments to the US and Europe in 2015. Rubicon Research was audited by USFDA in March 2015 & Dec 2015, both time they had Zero 483.

In 2012 Rubicon Research signed an agreement with Avantor Performance Materials to develop and market a novel gastro-retentive excipient that enables the delivery of molecules with a window of absorption.

In 2016, in Series B funding, the private equity firm Everstone Group bought out the stakes of Kotak Private Equity and Maharukh Rustomjee.

In 2019, Rubicon Research received a USD 100 million growth capital commitment from General Atlantic and acquired 15 ANDAs to augment its generic portfolio.

In 2020 Rubicon Research Private Limited acquired Impopharma Canada Limited with operations in Ontario, Canada, expanding its global development network, and established Rubicon Research Canada Ltd. The Canadian development facility specializes in the development and testing of pulmonary and nasal drug delivery systems and ophthalmic, otic, and dermal products.

In 2021 the company launched two subsidiaries—Rubicon Consumer Healthcare and Rubicon Academy. Rubicon Consumer Healthcare develops personal wellness, healthcare, and nutrition products and solutions for the Indian market. Rubicon Academy is a learning platform for pharmaceutical professionals and students.

In July 2021, Rubicon Research announced the acquisition of Meditab Specialities Limited’s oral liquid dosage and nasal product manufacturing facility located in Satara, Maharashtra. Meditab Specialities Limited is a wholly owned subsidiary of Cipla Limited. The Satara manufacturing facility is a state-of-the-art cGMP compliant and MHRA (UK) inspected production site.

Corporate structure

Ms. Pratibha Pilgaonkar, Co-founder, Managing Director
Mr. Sudhir Pilgaonkar, Co-founder, Chief Commercial Officer
Mr. Parag Sancheti. Chief Executive Officer
Dr. L.S. Rao, Chief Scientific Officer
Ms. Surabhi Sancheti, Senior Vice President
Mr. KG Ananthakrishnan, Advisor

References

Companies based in Mumbai
Pharmaceutical companies of India
Pharmaceutical companies established in 1999
1999 establishments in Maharashtra